Euploea radamanthus, the magpie crow, is a butterfly found in India and Southeast Asia that belongs to the danaid group of the brush-footed butterflies family. Euploea radamanthus is found in the Eastern Himalayas and into the Malay region.

See also
Danainae
Nymphalidae
List of butterflies of India
List of butterflies of India (Nymphalidae)

References

Euploea
Butterflies of Asia
Butterflies of Singapore
Butterflies of Indochina
Butterflies described in 1793